Atractus poeppigi, the basin ground snake, is a species of snake in the family Colubridae. The species can be found in Colombia, Brazil, and Peru.

References 

Atractus
Reptiles of Colombia
Reptiles of Brazil
Reptiles of Peru
Reptiles described in 1862
Taxa named by Giorgio Jan